
Gmina Gręboszów is a rural gmina (administrative district) in Dąbrowa County, Lesser Poland Voivodeship, in southern Poland.

Villages
Gmina Gręboszów contains the villages and settlements of Bieniaszowice, Biskupice, Borusowa, Gręboszów, Hubenice, Karsy, Kozłów, Lubiczko, Okręg, Ujście Jezuickie, Wola Gręboszowska, Wola Żelichowska, Zapasternicze, Zawierzbie and Żelichów.

Neighbouring gminas
Gmina Gręboszów is bordered by the gminas of Bolesław, Nowy Korczyn, Olesno, Opatowiec, Wietrzychowice and Żabno.

References
Polish official population figures 2006

Greboszow
Dąbrowa County